Jerzy Janikowski (13 April 1952 – 21 December 2006) was a Polish fencer. He competed in the individual and team épée events at the 1972 and 1976 Summer Olympics.

References

1952 births
2006 deaths
Polish male fencers
Olympic fencers of Poland
Fencers at the 1972 Summer Olympics
Fencers at the 1976 Summer Olympics
People from Dąbrowa Górnicza
Sportspeople from Silesian Voivodeship
21st-century Polish people
20th-century Polish people